Hanxin was an notorious Chinese academic fraudulence case, committed in the name of a digital signal processing (DSP) microchip. Chen Jin, a professor at Shanghai Jiao Tong University claimed to have developed the chip in 2003. The Hanxin 1 was reportedly the first DSP chip to have been wholly developed in China. However, the chip was later revealed to have been developed by Freescale Semiconductors, a former Motorola subsidiary, with the original identifications sandpapered away.

Exposure
At the beginning of 2006, an anonymous user posted an article on the Chinese internet forum Tianya Club about the forgery of this DSP chip with very detailed references.  Later various Chinese media including Ming Pao, a Hong Kong newspaper, claims that various ministries of the Chinese government have been investigating the Hanxin, and Chen may have duplicated a Freescale DSP from the West.

On May 12, 2006, the China News Service reported that Chen's research was faked and the Hanxin project had been cancelled.

The government decided to rescind all funds allocated to the Hanxin research, and permanently banned Chen from doing any government-funded research and ordered him to return investment money. He could also face a criminal investigation.

References

A Chinese chip scandal?
In a Scientist's Fall, China Feels Robbed of Glory
Computer chip fraud scandalises China
Two chip scandals set back China's IT industry

2006 in China
2006 hoaxes
Digital signal processors
Hoaxes in China
Scientific misconduct incidents